The House of Hillel (Beit Hillel) and House of Shammai (Beit Shammai) were, among Jewish scholars, two schools of thought during the period of tannaim, named after the sages Hillel and Shammai (of the last century BCE and the early 1st century CE) who founded them. These two schools had vigorous debates on matters of ritual practice, ethics, and theology which were critical for the shaping of the Oral Law and Judaism as it is today.

The Mishnah mentions the disagreement of Hillel and Shammai as one which had lasting positive value:
A disagreement which is for the sake of Heaven will be preserved, and one which is not for the sake of Heaven will not be preserved. What is a disagreement that is for the sake of Heaven? The disagreement of Hillel and Shammai. That is not for the sake of Heaven? The disagreement of Korah and his congregation.

In most cases, though not always, Beit Hillel's opinion is the more lenient and tolerant of the two. In nearly all cases, Beit Hillel's opinion has been accepted as normative by halacha, and is the opinion followed by modern Jews.

Halachic disputes

Examples
Only three (or, according to some authorities, five) disputes are recorded between Hillel and Shammai themselves. However, with time the differences between their respective schools multiplied, to the point that hundreds of disputes between them are recorded in the Talmud. The split between them was so deep that, according to the Talmud, "the Torah (Jewish law) became like two Torahs".

The matters they debated included:
Admission to Torah study: Beit Shammai believed only worthy students should be admitted to study Torah. Beit Hillel believed that Torah may be taught to anyone, in the expectation that they will repent and become worthy.
White lies: Whether one should tell an ugly bride that she is beautiful. Beit Shammai said it was wrong to lie, and Beit Hillel said that all brides are beautiful on their wedding day.
Divorce: Beit Shammai held that a man may only divorce his wife for a serious transgression, but Beit Hillel allowed divorce for even trivial offenses, such as burning a meal.
Hanukkah: Beit Shammai held that on the first night eight lights should be lit, and then they should decrease on each successive night, ending with one on the last night; while Beit Hillel held that one should start with one light and increase the number on each night, ending with eight. Beit Hillel's rationale is that as a general rule in halacha, one increases holiness, rather than decreasing. Beit Shammai's opinion was based on the halachic principle that allows one to derive law using similarities. The Sukkot Temple sacrifices involved 70 bullocks, reducing by one each day from 13 down to 7.
 Tu Bishvat: Beit Hillel holds that the new year for trees is on the 15th of the Jewish month of Shevat. Beit Shammai says it is on the 1st of Shevat. Beit Hillel's opinion is now accepted, so the new year is commonly called Tu Bishvat (literally "15th of Shevat").
 Forgetting to say grace after meals: Beit Shammai says that one who forgot to say Birkat Hamazon, and had left the place where he ate, should return to that place to recite birkat hamazon. Beit Hillel says that one should recite birkat hamazon in the place where he realizes his omission.

Beit Shammai and Beit Hillel are, respectively, the eighth and ninth most frequently mentioned halachic authorities in the Mishnah.

Discussion

In general, Beit Shammai's positions were stricter than those of Beit Hillel. It was said that the school of Shammai binds; the school of Hillel looses.  On the few occasions when the opposite was true, Beit Hillel would sometimes later recant their position. Similarly, though there are no records of Beit Shammai as a whole changing its stance, a few individuals from Beit Shammai are recorded as deserting a particular stringent opinion of their school, in favor of Beit Hillel's opinion.

The final law almost always coincides with Beit Hillel, not because they constituted the majority, but because Beit Hillel studied the view of their opponents, and because a Divine voice (bat-kol) was heard in Yavne declaring a general rule of practice: "Both schools espouse to the words of the living God, but the Halakhah follows the School of Hillel." Accordingly, halachic-practice was decided in favor of Beit Hillel since they were agreeable and forebearing (or more literally, piteous). Not only did they teach Beit Shammai's teachings, but they said them first before their own. The ruling in accordance with the teachings of the School of Hillel was also intended to bring conformity to Jewish practices.

Later in the same passage (Eruvin 13b) a disagreement is mentioned between the two schools, on whether it would have been more suitable (נוח) for man to have been created or not to have been created, with the school of Shammai taking the position that it would have been preferable if man had not been created. The passage then says something which seems to imply that the position of the school of Shammai was accepted ("נמנו וגמרו נוח לו לאדם שלא נברא יותר משנברא").

Modern day Rabbinic Judaism almost invariably follows the teachings of Hillel, but there are several notable exceptions. The Mishna provides a list of 18 matters in which the halacha was decided in favor of Beit Shammai.

According to one opinion in the Talmud, while halacha follows Beit Hillel, one may choose to follow either Beit Hillel or Beit Shammai as long as they do so consistently. However, if they follow the leniencies of both schools, they are considered evil; while if they follow the stringencies of both schools, the verse "The fool walks in darkness" is applied to them.

According to the Rabbi Isaac Luria, in the future messianic era halacha will follow Beit Shammai rather than Beit Hillel.

History
Both the Babylonian Talmud and the Jerusalem Talmud attribute the wide-range of disputes between the two schools of thought to the fact that the disciples of Hillel and Shammai did not fully serve their masters, to the point of understanding the fine differences in Halacha.

The political principles of Beit Shammai were similar to those of the Zealots, among whom they therefore found support. As public indignation against the Romans grew over the course of the 1st century, Beit Shammai gradually gained the upper hand, and the gentle and conciliatory Beit Hillel came to be ostracised from Beit Shammai's public acts of prayer.

As the Jewish conflict with the Romans grew, the nations surrounding Judea (then part of Roman Iudaea province) all sided with the Romans, causing Beit Shammai to propose that all commerce and communication between Jew and Gentile should be completely prohibited. Beit Hillel disagreed, but when the Sanhedrin convened to discuss the matter, the Zealots sided with Beit Shammai. Then Eleazar ben Hanania, the Temple captain and a leader of the militant Zealots, invited the students of both schools to meet at his house; Eleazar placed armed men at the door, and instructed them to let no-one leave the meeting. During the discussions Beit Shammai achieved a majority and were able to force all the remaining individuals to adopt a radically restrictive set of rules known as "Eighteen Articles"; later Jewish history came to look back on the occasion as a day of misfortune. According to one source, Beit Shammai obtained their majority either by killing members of Beit Hillel, or by intimidating them into leaving the room.

However, the fortunes of Beit Hillel improved after the First Jewish–Roman War, which had resulted in destruction of the Jewish Temple; Jewish leaders no longer had an appetite for war. Under Gamaliel II, the Sanhedrin, which was reconstituted in Yavne (see also Council of Jamnia), reviewed all the points disputed by Beit Hillel, and this time it was their opinions which won the Sanhedrin's support; on most issues, it was said that whenever Beit Shammai had disputed the opinion of Beit Hillel, Beit Shammai's opinion was now null and void.

Even though the two schools had vigorous arguments, they greatly respected each other. The Mishnah even records that the constituents of the two schools intermarried—despite their disagreements regarding the laws of marriage and divorce. According to the Talmud, each school kept track of lineages among its members to whom the other school would forbid marriage, and informed the other school of this status when marriage to such a person was proposed.

In later generations, a fast day was observed due to the conflict between the two houses, though this fast day is no longer observed. Various explanations are given of the tragedy which justified fasting: bloodshed which killed 3000 students; or else the simple fact of the Torah being divided into two incompatible interpretations.

Enactments 
The Houses of Hillel and Shammai convened to discuss arcane matters of Jewish law and to decide on new measures thought essential to ensure a more universal adherence to Jewish law and practice. Together, they legislated many new enactments and passed new decrees, in an effort to ensure that the people of Israel not transgress the basic laws bequeathed to them by Moses. These enactments were, therefore, seen as safeguards by the rabbinic clergy. While some of these enactments are still binding today, others have been cancelled by scholars of later generations.

According to Mishnah Shabbat 1:4, disciples of Hillel and Shammai met in parley within the home of the astute Hananiah ben Hezekiah ben Garon to vote on many new measures and to make them binding upon Israel. Not all decisions were gladly received by the School of Hillel, but they were compelled to acquiesce unto the rulings by virtue of the greater numbers of the School of Shammai, seeing that they were the unanimous party, and whose vote was the most consequential. The Sages at the time looked with displeasure upon many of these new enactments and decrees, saying that they had gone too far and have "filled-up the measure." Many of these rulings revolve around Israelites and their relationship to the priests who are required to eat their Terumah (Heave-offering) in a state of ritual purity. Talmudic exegete, Menachem Meiri, who cites Maimonides, lists the eighteen enactments/decrees made by them as follows:

The Jerusalem Talmud (Shabbat 1:4) mentions other enactments, besides these. Included therein are the prohibition of eating cheese produced by Gentiles, and the requirement of one who suffered a seminal or nocturnal emission (Hebrew: ba'al ḳeri) to immerse himself in a mikveh before reading from the Torah scroll, a ruling which was later rescinded, and the sweeping declaration that the lands of the Gentiles induce a defilement to any Jew that ventures therein.

See also
Hillel
Shammai
Talmud
Torah

References

 

Mishnah
Rabbinic Judaism
Jewish religious movements